Schüblig are various heavily smoked sausages made throughout the German-speaking part of Switzerland as well as the Black Forest and Lake Constance areas of southern Germany. Made of pork or beef, some schüblig are classified as dry sausage, while others are cooked smoked sausage. In Eastern Switzerland, Häsch Schüblig i de Ore? (have you got schüblig in your ears?) is a common saying when someone misunderstands and can't make out what is being said.

Schüblig is available in most Swiss cities.

See also
 Cervelat
 Culinary Heritage of Switzerland
 Swiss sausages and cured meats
 List of sausages

References

External links
 

Swiss sausages
Culinary Heritage of Switzerland